Changzhou railway station is a railway station of Jinghu railway and Shanghai-Nanjing Intercity Railway.The station located Changzhou, Jiangsu, China. Roughly there are 350 trains stop here each day. The station is a stop on Line 1 of the Changzhou Metro.

History
The station opened in 1908. The northern section of the station opened in 2010 with the opening of Shanghai-Nanjing Intercity High-Speed Railway.

Structure
The station is divided into two section: the southern section and northern section. The southern section (Mainly for Ordinary Trains) contains six lines and three platforms, the waiting room is south to the yard; The northern section (for most high-speed trains) contains seven lines and three platforms, the waiting room is north to the yard.

References

External links
Changzhou Railway Station 

Railway stations in Jiangsu
Railway stations in China opened in 1908
Stations on the Beijing–Shanghai Railway
Stations on the Shanghai–Nanjing Intercity Railway
Railway stations in Changzhou
Changzhou Metro stations